Cerăt is a commune in Dolj County, Oltenia, Romania with a population of 4,077 people. It is composed of two villages, Cerăt and Malaica.

References

Communes in Dolj County
Localities in Oltenia